The Nylons is the debut album from the Canadian a cappella quartet The Nylons released on Attic Records. The platinum-selling album contains their cover version of "The Lion Sleeps Tonight", and other hit songs as well as the group members' own compositions. Group members were Marc Connors (tenor), Claude Morrison (tenor), Paul Cooper (baritone) and Arnold Robinson (bass). The album reached number 8 in Canada.

Track listing

Personnel
The Nylons
Marc Connors - tenor vocals
Claude Morrison - tenor vocals
Paul Cooper - baritone vocals
Arnold Robinson - bass vocals

Certifications
The album attained platinum sales status within two months of its release.

References

External links
 

1982 debut albums
A cappella albums
Attic Records albums